Desmond John Morris FLS hon. caus. (born 24 January 1928) is an English zoologist, ethologist and surrealist painter, as well as a popular author in human sociobiology. He is known for his 1967 book The Naked Ape, and for his television programmes such as Zoo Time.

Early life
Morris was born in Purton, Wiltshire, to Marjorie (née Hunt) and children's fiction author Harry Morris. In 1933, the Morrises moved to Swindon where Desmond developed an interest in natural history and writing. He was educated at Dauntsey's School, a boarding school in Wiltshire.

In 1946, Morris joined the British Army for two years of national service, becoming a lecturer in fine arts at the Chiseldon Army College in Wiltshire. After being demobilised in 1948, he held his first one-man show of his own paintings at the Swindon Arts Centre, and studied zoology at the University of Birmingham. In 1950 he held a surrealist art exhibition with Joan Miró at the London Gallery. He held many other exhibitions in later years. Also in 1950, Desmond Morris wrote and directed two surrealist films, Time Flower and The Butterfly and the Pin. In 1951 he began a doctorate at the Department of Zoology, University of Oxford in animal behaviour. In 1954, he earned a Doctor of Philosophy for his work on the reproductive behaviour of the ten-spined stickleback.

Career
Morris stayed at Oxford, researching the reproductive behaviour of birds. In 1956 he moved to London as Head of the Granada TV and Film Unit for the Zoological Society of London, and studied the picture-making abilities of apes. The work included creating programmes for film and television on animal behaviour and other zoology topics. He hosted Granada TV's weekly Zoo Time programme until 1959, scripting and hosting 500 programmes, and 100 episodes of the show Life in the Animal World for BBC2. In 1957 he organised an exhibition at the Institute of Contemporary Arts in London, showing paintings and drawings composed by common chimpanzees. In 1958 he co-organised an exhibition, The Lost Image, which compared pictures by infants, human adults, and apes, at the Royal Festival Hall in London. In 1959 he left Zoo Time to become the Zoological Society's Curator of Mammals. In 1964, he delivered the Royal Institution Christmas Lecture on Animal Behaviour. In 1967 he spent a year as executive director of the London Institute of Contemporary Arts.

Morris's books include The Naked Ape: A Zoologist's Study of the Human Animal, published in 1967. The book sold well enough for Morris to move to Malta in 1968 to write a sequel and other books. In 1973 he returned to Oxford to work for the ethologist Niko Tinbergen. From 1973 to 1981, Morris was a Research Fellow at Wolfson College, Oxford. In 1979 he undertook a television series for Thames TV, The Human Race, followed in 1982 by Man Watching in Japan, The Animals Road Show in 1986 and then several other series. Morris wrote and presented the BBC documentary The Human Animal and its accompanying book in 1994. National Life Stories conducted an oral history interview (C1672/16) with Desmond Morris in 2015 for its Science and Religion collection held by the British Library.

Morris is a Fellow honoris causa of the Linnean Society of London.

Personal life
Morris's father suffered lung damage in World War I, and died when Morris was 14. His mother would not let him attend the funeral and he was sent off to friends in the countryside. He later said, "It was the beginning of a lifelong hatred of the establishment. The church, the government and the military were all on my hate list and have remained there ever since." His grandfather William Morris, an enthusiastic Victorian naturalist and founder of the Swindon local newspaper, greatly influenced him during his time living in Swindon.

In July 1952, Morris married Ramona Baulch; they had one son, Jason. In 1978, Morris was elected vice-chairman of Oxford United F.C.

Morris lived in the same house in North Oxford as the 19th-century lexicographer James Murray who worked on the Oxford English Dictionary. He has exhibited at the Taurus Gallery in North Parade, Oxford, close to where he lived. He is the patron of the Friends of Swindon Museum and Art Gallery and gave a talk to launch the charity in 1993. Since the death of his wife in 2018 he has lived with his son and family in Ireland.

Bibliography

Books
 
 The Big Cats (1965) – part of The Bodley Head Natural Science Picture Books, looking at the habits of the five Big Cats.
 The Mammals: A Guide to the Living Species (1965) – a listing of mammal genera, non-rodent non-bat species, and additional information on select species.
 Men and Pandas (1966) with Ramona Morris – third volume in the Ramona and Desmond Morris animal series.
  – a look at the humanity's animalistic qualities and its similarity with other apes. In 2011, Time magazine placed it on its list of the 100 best or most influential non-fiction books written in English since 1923.
 Men and Snakes (1968) with Ramona Morris – an exploration of the various complex relationships between humans and snakes
 The Human Zoo (1969) – a continuation of The Naked Ape, analysing human behaviour in big modern societies and their resemblance to animal behaviour in captivity.
 Patterns of Reproductive Behavior (1970)
 Intimate Behaviour (1971) – A study of the human side of intimate behaviour, examining how natural selection shaped human physical contact.
 Manwatching: A Field Guide to Human Behaviour (1978) – includes discussion of topic "Tie Signs"
 Gestures: Their Origin and Distribution (1979)
 Animal Days (1979) 
 The Soccer Tribe (1981)
 Pocket Guide to Manwatching (1982)
 Inrock (1983)
 Bodywatching – A Field Guide to the Human Species (1985) 
 The Book of Ages: Who Did What When (1985)
 The Art of Ancient Cyprus (1985)
 Catwatching and Cat Lore (1986) 
 Dogwatching (1986) 
 Horsewatching (1989) 
 Animalwatching (1990)
 Babywatching (1991)
 Christmas Watching (1992)
 Bodytalk (1994)
 The Human Animal (1994) – book and BBC documentary TV series
 The Human Sexes (1997) – Discovery/BBC documentary TV series
 Cat World: A Feline Encyclopedia (1997)
 The Secret Surrealist: The Paintings of Desmond Morris (1999)
 Body Guards: Protective Amulets and Charms (1999)
 The Naked Eye (2001)
 Dogs: The Ultimate Dictionary of over 1,000 Dog Breeds (2001)
 Peoplewatching: The Desmond Morris Guide to Body Language (2002)
 The Naked Woman: A Study of the Female Body (2004)
 Linguaggio muto (Dumb Language) (2004)
 The Nature of Happiness (2004)
 Watching (2006)
 Fantastic Cats (2007)
 The Naked Man: A Study of the Male Body (2008)
 Baby: A Portrait of the First Two Years of Life (2008)
 Planet Ape (2009) (co-authored with [Steve Parker])
 Owl (2009) – Part of the Reaktion Books Animal series
 The Artistic Ape (2013)
 Monkey (2013) – Part of the Reaktion Books Animal series
 Leopard (2014) – Part of the Reaktion Books Animal series
 Bison (2015) – Part of the Reaktion Books Animal series
 Cats in Art (2017) – Part of the Reaktion Books Animal series
 The Lives of the Surrealists (2018)
 Postures: Body Language in Art (2019)
 The British Surrealists (2022)

Book reviews

Filmography

 Zootime (Weekly, 1956–67)
 Life (1965–67)
 The Human Race (1982)
 The Animals Roadshow (1987–89)
 The Animal Contract (1989)
 Animal Country (1991–96)
 The Human Animal (1994)
 The Human Sexes'' (1997)

Criticism 
Some of Morris's theories have been criticized as untestable. For instance, geneticist Adam Rutherford writes that Morris commits "the scientific sin of the 'just-so' story – speculation that sounds appealing but cannot be tested or is devoid of evidence". However, this is also a criticism of adaptationism in evolutionary biology, not just of Morris.

Morris is also criticized for stating that gender roles have a deep evolutionary rather than cultural background.

References

External links

 Official website including a complete biography
 
 
 Dinjet il-Qattus/Catlore by Desmond Morris, translated into Maltese by Toni Aquilina, D es Litt.
 

1928 births
Military personnel from Wiltshire
20th-century British Army personnel
Living people
20th-century British artists
20th-century British writers
21st-century British artists
21st-century British writers
British contemporary artists
Alumni of Magdalen College, Oxford
Alumni of the University of Birmingham
English curators
English painters
English science writers
English television presenters
English zoologists
Ethologists
Fellows of the Zoological Society of London
Fellows of Wolfson College, Oxford
Founding members of the World Cultural Council
Human evolution theorists
People educated at Dauntsey's School
People from Purton
British surrealist artists
The New York Review of Books people